Moskvyata is a rural locality (a village) in Kultayevskoye Rural Settlement, Permsky District, Perm Krai, Russia. The population was 3 as of 2010. There are 2  streets.

Geography 
Moskvyata is located 28 km southwest of Perm (the district's administrative centre) by road. Murashi is the nearest rural locality.

References 

Rural localities in Permsky District